Achaea simplex is a species of moth of the family Erebidae. It is found in Waigeo, Mysol, the northern Moluccas, Sulawesi and Borneo.

External links
Species info

Achaea (moth)
Moths described in 1865
Moths of Asia